The fifth season of Indonesian Idol began on April 4, 2008 and finished on August 2, 2008. Amelia Natasha was replaced by Dewi Sandra as the co-host with Daniel Mananta.

Auditions were held in the following cities:
 Medan
 Palembang
 Manado
 Ambon
 Surabaya
 Yogyakarta
 Bandung
 Jakarta
 Denpasar

Elimination chart

External links 
 Official site 

Indonesian Idol
2008 Indonesian television seasons